In model theory, a branch of mathematical logic, the diagram of a structure is a simple but powerful concept for proving useful properties of a theory, for example the amalgamation property and the joint embedding property, among others.

Definition
Let  be a first-order language and  be a theory over  For a model  of  one expands  to a new language

by adding a new constant symbol  for each element  in  where  is a subset of the domain of  Now one may expand  to the model

See also

 Elementary diagram

References

Mathematical logic
Model theory